Eric Adniel Alfaro Calero (born October 3, 1982) is a Puerto Rican politician affiliated with the New Progressive Party (PNP). He was a member of the Puerto Rico House of Representatives from April 11, 2011 to January 1, 2013 representing District 16. Alfaro was appointed to fill the vacant seat of expelled representative Iván Rodríguez Traverzo.

Early years and studies

Eric Alfaro Calero was born on October 3, 1982 in Moca, but was raised in Isabela.

Alfaro graduated from Heriberto Domenech High School in 2000, receiving the Ceferino Cordero Award which is given to the student with the highest GPA. He then continued studying at the University of Puerto Rico at Mayagüez, where he completed a bachelor's degree in political science. During that time, he was part of the Exchange Program, which allowed him to take courses of international relations at the Universidad Complutense de Madrid in Spain.

After finishing his bachelor's degree, Alfaro began studying at the Eugenio María de Hostos School of Law in Mayagüez, where he obtained a Juris doctor.

Public service

After graduating, Alfaro served as legislative aide of the Government Commission of the House of Representatives of Puerto Rico, under the presidency of Jenniffer González. He was later promoted to legislative aide II at the Office of Legislative Services of the Capitol of Puerto Rico. In 2010, he became director of the Legislative Works Unit.

Alfaro is also a certified mediator for the Supreme Court of Puerto Rico, and is also Vicepresident of the Lion's Club of Isabela.

Political career

On April 3, 2011, Alfaro was elected to fill a vacant seat at the House of Representatives of Puerto Rico representing District 16. He was sworn in April 11.

Despite winning at the 2012 PNP primaries, Alfaro was defeated at the general elections that same year by José Rodríguez Quiles, from the Popular Democratic Party.

References

External links
Eric Alfaro Official biography
Eric Alfaro Profile on WAPA-TV

1982 births
Living people
New Progressive Party members of the House of Representatives of Puerto Rico
People from Moca, Puerto Rico
University of Puerto Rico alumni